"Live and Learn" is a song written by Jerry Fuller and performed by Andy Williams.  The song reached #12 on the adult contemporary chart and #119 on the Billboard chart in 1969.

References

1969 singles
Songs written by Jerry Fuller
Andy Williams songs
Columbia Records singles
1969 songs
Song recordings produced by Jerry Fuller